Hoehyeon Station is a station on the Seoul Subway Line 4. It is the closest station to the historical gate of Namdaemun, and also serves the major shopping district of Namdaemun Market. This station is located in Namchang-dong, Jung-gu, Seoul.

Station layout

Vicinity
Exit 4 : Seoul Hilton Hotel
Exit 5 : Namdaemun
Exit 6 : Namdaemun Market
Exit 7 : Shinsegae Department Store, Bank of Korea

References 

Seoul Metropolitan Subway stations
Metro stations in Jung District, Seoul
Railway stations in South Korea opened in 1985